In almost fifty years, Fyodor Dostoyevsky wrote more than 725 letters, 315 of which are preserved. Although Dostoyevsky hated writing letters (but enjoyed reading letters), as he believed that he could not impress himself properly, they form a majority of his works. They are such important resources of his life and beliefs that the whole corpus of letters equals to a biography.

Letters

References
General
 

Notes

Specific

Fyodor Dostoyevsky
Russian literature-related lists